Vilhelm Wohlert (27 May 1920 – 10 May 2007) was a Danish architect. His most notable work was on the Louisiana Museum of Modern Art in Humlebæk, Denmark.

Earlt life and education
Wohlert was born in Copenhagen, Denmark.
He trained at the Royal Danish Academy of Fine Arts' School of Architecture, where one of his teachers was Kaare Klint (1888–1954). From 1946-47, he  worked in Stockholm with the architects Sven Markelius and Hakon Ahlberg, both practitioners of Scandinavian modernism. He also worked in collaboration with Kaare Klint until his death in 1954.

Career

In 1958, he and his partner and fellow architect Jørgen Bo  (1919-1999) started work on the Danish modernist architecture Louisiana Museum of Modern Art  in Humbaek,  a project on which they would work for the next 33 years.

In Germany, they were also responsible for the Bochum Museum of Art (Kunstmuseum Bochum) which opened in 1960, as well as the Gustav-Lübcke-Museum in Hamm, which was commissioned in  1993.

Another major part of Wohlert's work was on Danish churches.  He designed  Stengård Church (Stengård kirke) and worked on the restoration of both the Lutheran and Catholic cathedrals of Copenhagen: the Church of Our Lady and St. Ansgar's Church.  He also designed the mausoleum of King Frederick IX at Roskilde Cathedral.

Wohlert was also an educator, early in his career at University of California, Berkeley where he was also awarded the post of visiting professor at the University of California, Berkeley from 1951 through 1953.
Later for many years as a professor at the Royal Danish Academy of Fine Arts  in Copenhagen where he held the position of professor  from 1968 until 1986.

Distinctions
 1982 Dreyer Honorary Award

References

Other sources
 
 

Modernist architects
Knights of the Order of the Dannebrog
Architects from Copenhagen
1920 births
2007 deaths
Recipients of the Eckersberg Medal
Royal Danish Academy of Fine Arts alumni
Recipients of the C.F. Hansen Medal